The following is the complete discography of official releases by Psychostick. Psychostick is a comedic metal band from Arizona formed in 2000, currently consisting of Rob "Rawrb" Kersey (lead vocals), Josh "The J" Key (guitar/vocals), Alex "Shmalex" Dontre (drums), and Matty J "Poolemoose" Rzemyk (bass/vocals). Kersey, Key, and Dontre are the band's only constant members, being in the band since its conception. The band has released two demos, five studio albums, three EPs, one DVD, seven music videos, and twelve singles.

Albums

Studio albums

Compilations

Extended plays

Demos

Singles

Videography

Video albums

Music videos

References

Discographies of American artists
Comedian discographies
Heavy metal group discographies